The Battle of Köse Dağ was fought between the Sultanate of Rum ruled by the Seljuq dynasty and the Mongol Empire on June 26, 1243, at the defile of Köse Dağ, a location between Erzincan and Gümüşhane in modern northeastern Turkey.  The Mongols achieved a decisive victory.

Background 
During the reign of Ögedei Khan, the Sultanate of Rum offered friendship and a modest tribute to Chormaqan, a kheshig and one of the Mongols' greatest generals. Under Kaykhusraw II, however, the Mongols began to pressure the sultan to go to Mongolia in person, give hostages, and accept a Mongol darughachi.

Location 
The 13th-century Armenian historian Gregory of Akner writes that the battle took place in a field between Erzurum and Erzincan, while Kirakos of Gandzak states that it took place close to a village called Chʻmankatuk, which may refer to modern-day Üzümlü (formerly Cimin) in the Erzincan Province of Turkey. Rashid al-Din Hamadani and other sources call the site of the battle Köse Dağ, which means "bald/beardless mountain" in Turkish.

Battle
Under the leadership of Baiju, the Mongol commander, the Mongols attacked Rum in the winter of 1242–1243 and seized the city of Erzurum. Sultan Kaykhusraw II immediately called on his neighbours to contribute troops to resist the invasion. The Empire of Trebizond sent a detachment and the sultan engaged a group of "Frankish" (Western European) mercenaries. Due to internal disagreements about the war, King Hethum I of Armenian Cilicia delayed joining Kaykhusraw's army, which left without him. A few Georgian nobles such as Pharadavla of Akhaltsikhe and Dardin Shervashidze also joined him, but most Georgians were compelled to fight alongside their Mongol overlords. The Georgian-Armenian contingent within the Mongol army included Hasan-Jalal I, the ruler of Khachen.

The decisive battle was fought at Köse Dağ on June 26, 1243. Various figures are given in the primary sources for the size of the opposing armies, all with the Seljuqs outnumbering the Mongols: 160,000 or 200,000 for the sultan's army (which are certainly exaggerations) and 30,000 or 10,000 for the Mongol force. 80,000 and 30,000 for the sizes of the Seljuq and Mongol armies, respectively, are the more likely numbers. Baiju brushed aside an apprehensive notice from his Georgian officer regarding the size of the Seljuq army, stating that they counted as nothing the numbers of their enemies: "the more they are, the more glorious it is to win, and the more plunder we shall secure".

Kaykhusraw II rejected the proposal of his experienced commanders to wait for the Mongol attack. Instead, he sent a force of 20,000 men, led by inexperienced commanders, against the Mongol army. The Mongol army, feigning retreat, turned back, encircled the Seljuq army and defeated it.

When the rest of the Seljuq army witnessed their defeat, many Seljuq commanders and their soldiers, including Kaykhusraw II, started to abandon the battlefield. Eventually, the Seljuq army was left without leaders and most of their soldiers had deserted, without seeing any combat.

Aftermath
After their victory, the Mongols took control of the cities of Sivas and Kayseri. The sultan fled to Ankara but was subsequently forced to make peace with Baiju and pay a substantial tribute to the Mongol Empire.

The defeat resulted in a period of turmoil in Anatolia and led directly to the decline and disintegration of the Seljuq state. The Empire of Trebizond became a vassal state of the Mongol Empire. Furthermore, the Armenian Kingdom of Cilicia became a vassal state of the Mongols. Real power over Anatolia was exercised by the Mongols.

References

External links
Kirakos of Gandzak: History of Armenia (part 35) 13th century
History of Anatolian Seljuks

Battles involving the Mongol Empire
Battles involving the Sultanate of Rum
Kose Dag
Battles in medieval Anatolia
Conflicts in 1243
History of Erzincan Province
History of Gümüşhane Province
Battles involving the Empire of Trebizond
1243 in Asia
1243 in Europe
13th century in the Kingdom of Georgia
Kose Dag